Te Heuheu may refer to several people from the Te Heuheu family which has provided chiefs of the Māori Ngati Tuwharetoa iwi (tribe) for approximately 200 years.  The name is also used for several landmarks in the central North Island of New Zealand:

People
Herea Te Heuheu Tūkino I (ca. 1750–1820), first in the line of the Te Heuheu chiefs
Mananui Te Heuheu Tūkino II (died 1846), son of Tūkino I
Iwikau Te Heuheu Tūkino III (died 1862), brother of Tūkino II
Horonuku or Patātai Te Heuheu Tūkino IV  (1821–1888), son of Tūkino II
Tūreiti Te Heuheu Tūkino V (c. 1865–1921), son of Tūkino IV
Hoani Te Heuheu Tūkino VI (1897–1944), son of Tūkino V
Sir Hepi Te Heuheu VII, KBE (1919–1997), Te Heuheu Tūkino VII, son of Tūkino VI
Sir Tumu Te Heuheu, KNZM (born 1942/1943), Te Heuheu Tūkino VIII, son of Tūkino VII and current chief
Hon. Dame Georgina te Heuheu, DNZM QSO (born 1943), a former member of Parliament in New Zealand & Cabinet Minister

Places
Te Heuheu, a peak on Mount Ruapehu in the Tongariro National Park on the North Island of New Zealand

History of New Zealand